Sterling Black Icon - Chapter III - Black But Shining is the third full-length album by the German melodic death metal band, Fragments of Unbecoming. The European release edition for Sterling Black Icon comes with an "extra noble" cardboard-box.

Track listing

 "Carmine Preface ~{Entrance}~" − 0:52
 "Sterling Black Icon" − 5:14
 "Weave Their Barren Path" − 4:08
 "Dear Floating Water" − 7:11
 "Breathe in the Black to See" − 7:21
 "Ride for a Fall" − 0:44
 "A Faint Illumination" − 5:49
 "Live for This Moment, Stay 'Til the End" − 5:59
 "Scythe of Scarecrow" − 4:49
 "Onward to the Finger of God" − 1:37
 "Stand the Tempest" − 4:12
 "Chambre Noire ~{Departure}~" − 2:30 (translated as Dark Room in French)

Personnel

Band

 Sam Anetzberger - Lead Death Vocals
 Stefan Weimar - Backing Death Vocals, Guitar
 Sascha Ehrich - Guitar, Acoustic guitar
 Wolle Schellenberg - Bass
 Ingo Maier - Drums

Production and other

 The drums were recorded in PMT Studios by Tikk. Watchful assistance and engineering by Christoph Brandes.
 All guitars, bass guitars and vocals were recorded and engineered in Sound Tunnel Studios by Ingo Maier.
 Mixed and mastered by Christoph Brandes at the Iguana Studios.
 Produced by Fragments of Unbecoming and Christoph Brandes.
 All lyrics and musical arrangements by Fragments of Unbecoming, except "Chambre Noire" by Marcel Schiborr.
 Final infinite scream on "A Faint Illumination" by Todd "Brave" Collins.
 Band photography by Bernd Siebold.
 Digital band picture make-up by "Groundfrost"
 Artwork was done in cooperation by Niklas Sundin and Sascha Ehrich.
 Layout and design by Sascha Ehrich.
 "Fragments Of Unbecoming" logotype by Sascha Ehrich, courtesy of "Precious Art".

References

Fragments of Unbecoming albums
2006 albums